Mexican Joyride is a 1947 Warner Bros. Looney Tunes cartoon directed by Arthur Davis and written by Dave Monahan. The cartoon was released on November 29, 1947, and stars Daffy Duck.

Plot
Daffy Duck drives to Mexico for a vacation, and after a harrowing experience with the local cuisine that literally sets his mouth afire, Daffy goes to a bullfight ring to observe the spectacle. When Daffy jeers at the bull, the horned beast removes the clothes from the human matador and puts them on Daffy as a challenge to the duck to fight the bull in the ring.

Daffy foils the bull with a proposed wager on a hat trick, betting the bull to guess which of three sombreros Daffy is hiding under. Daffy sees to it that the bull guesses wrong and supplies a machine gun for the impoverished bull to commit suicide. The bull realizes that he is being fooled and, firing the machine gun, chases Daffy out of the bullfight ring. Daffy scrambles to his car to leave Mexico, thinking he has escaped the belligerent bull. But the bull is riding in the back seat of Daffy's vehicle, unbeknownst to Daffy.

References

External links
 

1947 films
1947 animated films
1947 short films
Bullfighting films
Daffy Duck films
Films directed by Arthur Davis
Films scored by Carl Stalling
Films set in Mexico
Looney Tunes shorts
Warner Bros. Cartoons animated short films
1940s Warner Bros. animated short films
Films about vacationing